Charles Bruce Stuart (November 30, 1881 – October 28, 1961) was a Canadian amateur and professional ice hockey forward who played for the Quebec Bulldogs, Ottawa Senators, Montreal Wanderers, Portage Lakes Hockey Club, Pittsburgh Victorias and Pittsburgh Professionals from 1899 to 1911. Stuart is considered to be an early version of a power forward, a forward who combines size and physical play with scoring ability, in hockey history. Stuart won the Stanley Cup with both the Ottawa Senators and the Montreal Wanderers.

Personal life
Stuart was born on November 30, 1881, one of five children to Captain William Stuart and Rachel Hodgson Stuart. He had two brothers: Allan Gilbert and  William Hodgson (Hod) and two sisters: Jessie Maud and Lottie May.

Playing career
Bruce and his older brother Hod played for Ottawa Hockey Club (Senators) in the Canadian Amateur Hockey League (CAHL) in 1899, in their home city of Ottawa. In 1900, they moved to Quebec City for business. They started playing hockey again in 1901, joining the Quebec Bulldogs in the CAHL. He then played professionally with the Pittsburgh Victorias in the Western Pennsylvania Hockey League (WPHL) in 1902–03 and in Houghton, with the Portage Lakes Hockey Club, in the old International Professional Hockey League (IPHL) between 1904–1907. With Portage Lakes Hockey Club he won two league titles in 1905–06 & 1906–07 as a teammate of Cyclone Taylor.

Stuart joined the Montreal Wanderers for the 1907–08 season in time to win the Stanley Cup in 1908, and then captained the Ottawa Senators in 1909 to the Stanley Cup.

Bruce Stuart's brother Hod, a defenseman who was considered one of the better hockey players in Canada at the time, died in a diving accident in the Bay of Quinte near Belleville, Ontario on June 23, 1907 at an age of 28. At the time of the accident, the two brothers had not seen each other for over a year, as they had been playing in different cities.
 
In 1910, when the National Hockey Association (NHA) imposed a salary cap, cutting player's salaries in half, Stuart attempted to form a rival league. The rival league failed to organize, as the Montreal Arena was refused to the players. Stuart returned to captain the Senators to the 1911 Stanley Cup.

Playing style

Bruce Stuart, a centre forward position wise, was a tall player for his era measuring around 6 feet in height, and weighing around 180 pounds. When Stuart replaced Ernie Russell at the centre forward position on the Montreal Wanderers in March 1908 the Ottawa Citizen recognized that while he "is not as tricky a scorer as Russell" he was thought "to be a better man carrying the disc through a defense", and the newspaper also recognized that he still had good shot. He also played occasionally at other forward positions, including rover and left wing.

Stuart employed a physical playing style along to his size, which earned him a fair share of injuries throughout his hockey career. During the 1910 NHA season Stuart suffered a broken left collarbone in game against the Renfrew Creamery Kings on February 12, after a scuffle with Hay Millar and a subsequent collision with Frank Patrick. The injury held him out for the remainder of the 1910 season and significantly weakened the Senators in their quest on defending the Stanley Cup against the Montreal Wanderers. Stuart had also, on different occasions during his hockey career, both of his knees dislocated, three ribs broken, his nose smashed twice, a bone in his right foot splintered, several teeth knocked out and his right hand fractured.

In the local Ottawa newspapers Stuart was often praised for his leadership qualities. During the 1910 season, when he captained the Ottawa Senators in the NHA, the Ottawa Journal claimed him "unanimously conceded to be the greatest hockey general that ever wore skates" and that he had "complete control over his men from the minute the game starts". The newspaper also noted him to be a clutch scorer and claimed that he had "scored more goals, at critical moments, when his team was behind, than any other forward in the game".

Post career
Stuart retired from playing after the 1910–11 season. He managed the Bruce Stuart and Co. shoe store he owned in Ottawa until 1952 along with some coaching. The shoe store, located at 275 Bank Street in Ottawa, outside of shoes and boots also sold skates.

After his player career Stuart took to golf and curling for recreation. As a golf player he was a member of the Ottawa Hunt and Golf Club. As a curling player he was active with the Ottawa Curling Club, and he donated a trophy to the club for competition.

Despite his age, he attended his induction into the Hockey Hall of Fame in Toronto in 1961. He died not long after, survived by his wife Irene Stuart (nee MacDonald). He was interred at Beechwood Cemetery.

Statistics
Exh. = Exhibition games

* Stanley Cup Champion.

Achievements
IPHL champion – 1905–06 & 1906–07 (Portage Lakes Hockey Club)
Stanley Cup – 1908 (Montreal Wanderers); 1909, 1910 & 1911 (Ottawa Senators)

References

Bibliography

Notes

External links

 
 

1881 births
1961 deaths
Hockey Hall of Fame inductees
Ice hockey people from Ottawa
Montreal Wanderers players
Ottawa Senators (NHA) players
Ottawa Senators (original) players
Pittsburgh Victorias players
Portage Lakes Hockey Club players
Quebec Bulldogs players
Stanley Cup champions
Canadian ice hockey centres